David C. Godbey (born 1957), United States federal judge
William Baxter Godbey (1833-1920), American evangelist

See also 
Lisa Godbey Wood